The Antiochian Orthodox Archdiocese of Mexico, Venezuela, Central America and the Caribbean is a jurisdiction of the Greek Orthodox Church of Antioch. Its current Metropolitan is Ignacio (Samaán).

The Antiochian Orthodox Church is administered by Patriarch John X of Antioch in Damascus, Syria.  
 
The Greek Orthodox Patriarchate of Antioch operates several archdioceses throughout the world, one of which is the Antiochian Archdiocese of Mexico, Venezuela, Central America, and the Caribbean.   
 
In charge of the archdiocese is Archbishop Ignacio at the Saint George Cathedral in Mexico City, Mexico.

Parish List

The Antiochian Orthodox Christian Archdiocese of Mexico has parishes in the following countries:

 Mexico
 Mexico City - Saint George Cathedral 
Huixquilucan - Saint Peter and Saint Paul Cathedral
 Mérida - Dormition of the Theotokos
 Jilotepec - Saint Anthony the Great Monastery
 Tijuana - Project México / Saint Innocent's Orphanage
 Venezuela
 Caracas
 Valencia
 Puerto Rico
 Guatemala
 Orthodox Mission "Casa de la misericordia"

See also
Antiochian Orthodox Archdiocese of Buenos Aires and All Argentina
Antiochian Orthodox Archdiocese of Santiago and All Chile
Antiochian Orthodox Archdiocese of São Paulo and All Brazil

References

External links
 

Eastern Orthodox dioceses in North America
Eastern Orthodox dioceses in South America
Greek Orthodox Church of Antioch
Latin America and the Caribbean